is a stable of sumo wrestlers, part of the Dewanoumi ichimon or group of stables. It has a long, prestigious history. Its current head coach is former maegashira Oginohana. As of January 2023 it had 19 wrestlers.

History

The stable's rise to prominence was due to the 19th yokozuna Hitachiyama, who transformed it from a minor stable when he joined sumo into a powerful recruiting house when he retired in 1914 and became its head coach. Under his leadership the stable produced three yokozuna, Ōnishiki, Tochigiyama and Tsunenohana, ōzeki Kyushuzan, Tsushimanada, Ōnosato, and Hitachiiwa, and 20 other top division wrestlers. At its peak the stable contained over 200 wrestlers, and Hitachiyama's refusal to allow any of his disciples to break away and form new stables when they retired ensured its dominance remained after his death in 1922 at the age of 48. Tsuneohana was the rijichō, or head of the Japan Sumo Association from 1944 to 1957, and every subsequent head from 1968 to 1998, including former Dewanohana Kuniichi and the 50th yokozuna Sadanoyama, was a member of the Dewanoumi ichimon. The 57th yokozuna Mienoumi was the first Dewanoumi stable member to be permitted to branch out and open a new stable, which he did in 1981 with Musashigawa stable. (A previous yokozuna from the stable, Chiyonoyama, had been thrown out of the Dewanoumi ichimon in 1967 after setting up Kokonoe stable). Long time head Sadanoyama stood down in 1996, passing control over to former sekiwake Washūyama.

The demotion of Futen'ō to the makushita division in July 2010 left the stable without any sekitori (wrestlers in the salaried divisions) for the first time since 1898. This continued until   was promoted to the jūryō division for the November 2014 tournament (in which he managed only five wins and was immediately demoted). In January 2015 the stable saw former maegashira Towanoyama announce his retirement, leaving  and the 44-year-old , with four tournaments in jūryō between them, as the only other wrestlers apart from Dewahayate with any sekitori experience. However shortly afterwards the stable recruited former amateur yokozuna Mitakeumi who quickly made jūryō in July 2015 and the top makuuchi division in January 2016. In July 2017 he became the first member of the stable to reach sekiwake rank since 1982, and in July 2018 the first to win a top division championship for the stable since Mienoumi in 1980. In January 2022, Mitakeumi won his third top division yūshō, and was promoted to ōzeki.

People

Ring name conventions
Many wrestlers at this stable take ring names or shikona that begin with the characters 出羽 (read: dewa), which are taken from the first two characters of the stable's name.

Owners

2014–present: 11th Dewanoumi Akikazu (riji, former maegashira Oginohana)
1996-2014: 10th Dewanoumi Yoshikazu (riji, former sekiwake Washūyama)
1968-1996: 9th Dewanoumi Tomotaka (the 50th yokozuna Sadanoyama)
1960-1968: 8th Dewanoumi Yoshihide (former maegashira Dewanohana)
1949-1960: 7th Dewanoumi Hidemitsu (the 31st yokozuna Tsunenohana)
1922-1949: 6th Dewanoumi Kajinosuke (former komusubi Ryōgoku)
1914-1922: 5th Dewanoumi Taniemon (the 19th yokozuna Hitachiyama)
1890-1914: 4th Dewanoumi Unemon (former maegashira Hitachiyama)
c. 1862-1890: 3rd Dewanoumi (former makushita Katsuragawa)

Coaches
Dekiyama Sōichi (consultant, former sekiwake Dewanohana)
Nakadachi Yasuteru (iin, former komusubi Oginishiki)
Takasaki Ryūsui (iin, former maegashira Kinkaiyama)

Notable wrestlers

Active

Mitakeumi (best rank: ōzeki)

Former

Hitachiyama (the 19th yokozuna)
Ōnishiki (the 26th yokozuna)
Tochigiyama (the 27th yokozuna)
Tsunenohana (the 31st yokozuna)
Musashiyama (the 33rd yokozuna)
Akinoumi (the 37th yokozuna)
Chiyonoyama (the 41st yokozuna)
Sadanoyama (the 50th yokozuna)
Mienoumi (the 57th yokozuna)
Hitachiiwa (former ōzeki)
Shionoumi (former ōzeki)
Masuiyama (former ōzeki)
Ryōgoku (former sekiwake)
Tenryū (former sekiwake)
Dewaminato (former sekiwake)
Dewanohana (former sekiwake)
Ōnishiki (former komusubi)
Mainoumi (former komusubi)
Dewanohana (former maegashira)
Kushimaumi (former maegashira)

Assistant
Fukuryūdake (sewanin, former jūryō, real name Shigeo Nakao)

Referee
Kimura Chishū (juryo gyōji, real name Ryōta Kobayashi)

Usher
Yōhei (makushita yobidashi, real name Yōhei Kadooka)

Hairdressers
Tokoriki (fourth class tokoyama)

Location and access
Tokyo, Sumida Ward, Ryōgoku 2-3-15
7 minute walk from Ryōgoku Station on Sōbu Line

See also
List of sumo stables
List of active sumo wrestlers
List of past sumo wrestlers
Glossary of sumo terms

References

External links
Official site 
Japan Sumo Association profile

Active sumo stables